Sisaket  is a town municipality in northeast Thailand, incorporating Mueang Nuea and Mueang Tai Subdistricts and parts of Cham, Nong Khrok, Pho, Phon kha, and Ya Plong Subdistricts, all in Mueang Sisaket district, the capital of Sisaket province. As of 2017, it has a population of 40,117.

History

The municipality was created by a royal decree that took effect on 29 November 1936 and was then named Khu Khan after the province. The municipality covered the subdistricts of Mueang Nuea and Mueang Tai, with the area of 3.26 km².

On 6 March 1939, the municipality was renamed Sisaket, following the renaming of the province the year before.

On 12 March 1987, the municipality was extended to parts of Cham, Nong Khrok, Pho, Phon kha, and Ya Plong Subdistricts, with the total area of 36.66 km².

Transport
Sisaket is on the northeastern railway line from Bangkok's central station, Hua Lamphong Railway Station to Warin Chamrap District, and also has frequent service to and from Bangkok's Northern Bus Terminal (Mo Chit Mai), with bus connections to all the northern and northeastern provinces.

References

External links

 

Populated places in Sisaket province
Cities and towns in Thailand
Isan